Deepdale is a hamlet in Langstrothdale in the Yorkshire Dales in the north of England. The hamlet was originally in the  wapentake of Staincliffe and has been written as Deep Dale, Deep-Dale and Deepdale.

Deepdale lies on the north bank of the River Wharfe, on the route of the Dales Way. To the west of the hamlet lies Deepdale Meadows SSSI, a selection of hayfields with rare grasses. The fields are indicative of what lowland Yorkshire Dales fields would have looked like before intensive farming methods changed the landscape.

References

External links 

Villages in North Yorkshire
Wharfedale